

Late Modern Period
1764 Battle of Atakpamé

Contemporary History
July 28, 1914 — November 11, 1918 World War I
August 3, 1914 — November 23, 1918 African theatre of World War I
August 9, 1914 — August 26, 1914 Togoland Campaign
August 15, 1914 Battle of Agbeluvhoe
August 22, 1914 Battle of Chra
January 13, 1963 Togolese coup d'état

See also
Military of Togo
Togolese Army
Togolese Navy
Togolese Air Force
Military history of Africa
African military systems to 1,800 C.E.
African military systems 1,800 C.E. — 1,900 C.E.
African military systems after 1,900 C.E.

Military history of Togo
Conflicts